The Governor Hotel may refer to:

 The Sentinel Hotel, Portland, Oregon, a two-building hotel which was named The Governor Hotel from 1992 to 2014
 The Seward Hotel, Portland, Oregon, which was named The Governor Hotel from 1931 to 1992 and was the east wing of the Governor Hotel from 1992 to 2014
 The Elks Temple (Portland, Oregon), which was the west wing of the Governor Hotel from 1992 to 2014 and housed the hotel's main entrance from 2004 to 2014
 The Rector Hotel (Seattle, Washington), known as the Governor Hotel from 1931 to about 1942.